The Central District of Farashband County is a district (bakhsh) in Farashband County, Fars Province, Iran. At the 2006 census, its population was 30,817, in 6,739 families.  The District has two cities: Farashband and Nujin. The District has two rural districts (dehestan): Aviz Rural District and Nujin Rural District.

References 

Farashband County
Districts of Fars Province